Agnes (Aragonese: Agnés) was a Queen of Aragon, the second wife of Ramiro I of Aragon. She is speculated to have been daughter of either William VI, Duke of Aquitaine or William VII, Duke of Aquitaine, and perhaps remarried to Peter I, Count of Savoy. 

Following the death of his wife Ermesinda of Bigorre, Ramiro I of Aragon next appears with a wife named Agnes. It is believed Agnes outlived her husband, who died on 8 May 1063 after they were married for about a decade. They don't seem to have had any children. Since her name is one used frequently in the family of the Dukes of Aquitaine and Ramiro's family repeatedly would make marriage alliances with the ducal family, it has been proposed that Agnes herself also derived from that kindred although her precise placement has been subject to speculation.  William VI and William VII have both been suggested as possible fathers.  

Peter I, Count of Savoy, would later marry an "Agnes, daughter of William of Poitou", herself speculated to have been daughter of William VII. It is possible that this was the widowed Queen of Aragon, although if so, Agnes would have had to have married Ramiro at a very young age.

References

House of Poitiers
Aragonese queen consorts
House of Aragon
11th-century people from the Kingdom of Aragon
11th-century Spanish women